Todd Lundy (born February 17, 1956) is an American former professional tennis player.

A native of Pennsylvania, Lundy won three successive PIAA state singles championships from 1972 to 1974, while attending State College. He went on to study at Harvard University and was a member of the varsity tennis team. 

In 1981 he featured in three singles main draws on the professional Grand Prix circuit.

Lundy is now an attorney in Denver, Colorado.

References

External links
 
 

1956 births
Living people
American male tennis players
Harvard Crimson men's tennis players
Tennis people from Pennsylvania